= The Citation Project =

The Citation Project is a series of studies that measure and analyze first-year college writing students' source use and their ability to understand and implement sources within their own writing. The Citation Project reveals students' source-use habits and the issues that can be seen based on their lack of proper citation skills, such as the prevalence of plagiarism, institution policies, and the results of current writing pedagogy. The Citation Project's central findings were first presented at the Conference on College Composition and Communication in 2012. Although The Citation Project originally referred to this single 2012 study, the feedback received led to the conception of the Project as a broader initiative and as a place to gather and publish studies and data relating to student writing habits for the use of other researchers.

== Method ==
The Citation Project's data comes from the work of 20 researchers analyzing 174 first-year composition students' research papers. The student papers studied originated from 16 institutions across the United States of America, including community colleges, public and private universities, denominational colleges, and Ivy Leagues. Researchers used bibliographic coding to aggregate data regarding the type, length, reading level, and usage of students' sources.

== Findings ==
=== Student source assessment and use ===
This study found that students were capable of identifying, locating, and accessing librarian-approved academic sources, most commonly accessing them with the internet. Despite students demonstrating their ability to find appropriate sources, they tend to exclusively cite the first few pages of their sources. Students' use and analysis of their citations are often limited, frequently resorting to patchwriting, directly restating their source's points, and omitting their own interpretations of their reference's ideas. The Citation Project also highlights students' struggle to accurately determine, address, and value their sources' bias, authority, and credibility.

According to the Project's researchers' analysis, these habits demonstrate that first-year college writing students minimally engage with their sources and the academic conversations between them. One researcher from the Citation Project, Rebecca Moore Howard, believes these findings do not point towards students being lazy, but is rather a result of a writing pedagogy that prioritizes efficient, product-focused writing. Another interpretation offered by Sandra Jamieson, another researcher from the Citation Project explains their findings as a result of a lack of adherence to Information Learning (IL) Standards.

=== Pedagogy ===
A significant focus of The Citation Project is the development of pedagogical practices intended to equip students with writing and research techniques that will set them up for future success. Writers associated with The Citation Project, such as Tricia Serviss, believe that the practices of teachers surrounding academic integrity and writing practices are what form the foundation of how students think about writing and how to engage with assignments throughout their academic career. They also stress the importance of teaching students to effectively engage with sources rather than simply how to correctly cite them. The Citation Project asserts that endowing students with the ability to read, understand, and synthesize a variety of sources in their writing is a skill that will benefit them throughout their academic careers, and that the surface level typographical focus that many writing programs utilize is inadequate.

== Plagiarism ==
One of the areas that The Citation Project also looks at is how students commit plagiarism throughout their writing. Plagiarism tends to be a checkpoint that gives instructors a sense where students' citation skills stand. Findings from The Citation Project reveal that the most common type of plagiarism is patchwriting which is the act of using the same sentence with only changing a couple of words. These types of issues can be seen as a learning curve due to lack of proper training. Student's that commit plagiarism are often unaware.

=== Policies ===
Another issue found is that academic plagiarism policies may not benefit a student's growth but may instead obstruct it. Policies against plagiarism tend to be harsh on the student that committed of offense. Even though student plagiarism is often unintentional academic institutions see this behavior as intentional. Student may then face harsh consequences as a result from their lack of citation knowledge. Additionally, higher level institutions assume that new students already have the skill set to avoid plagiarism which may be an unrealistic expectation.

== Legacy ==
=== Inspired studies ===
==== Parrott and Napier ====
In one study, "Critical Reading and Student Self-Selected Texts: Results of a Collaborative, Explicit Curricular Approach," Jill Parrot and Trenia Napier quoted the Citation Project's findings as evidence that current collegiate writing curriculums are an ineffective means of teaching students how to properly write academic research papers. The researchers accredited current writing pedagogy's lack of emphasis on teaching critical reading skills. Parrott and Napier tested their thesis by seeing if students would produce more academic writing if they partook in a writing course that taught critical reading. Their results mostly went against this hypothesis, finding students who received additional critical reading training only significantly improved in how they integrated their sources.

==== Kocatepe ====
In May Mehtap Kocatep's study, "Reconceptualising the notion of finding information: How undergraduate students construct information as they read-to-write in an academic writing class," Kocatep expresses that she believes current conversations around writing pedagogy, including the Citation Project, operate with the underlying misconception that information is an easily discoverable static entity and its retrieval is an objective, unbiased decision. Kocatepe instead offers the analysis of what students view as valuable information and if it is worth using is influenced by the socially constructed meanings available to writers at the moment. To further examine students' source engagement, Kocatepe did a study on how female university students from the United Arab Emirates find, retrieve, use, and value sources. Kocatepe's results mainly noted students' almost exclusive reliance on using Google to find sources, as well as how students' navigated mainly English-speaking academic conversations as non-native English speakers.

==== Dahlen, Nordstrom-Sanchez, and Graff ====
Dahlen, Nordstrom-Sanchez, and Graff built their study off The Citation Project research in order to explore the attitudes and practices of students in an undergraduate writing course. As the researchers acknowledge, data collected by the Citation Project was the subject of the bulk of their analysis. This study sought to examine undergraduate writing practices tied to source-usage and elucidate any relevant trends. Dahlen, Nordstrom-Sanchez and Graff found that undergraduate writing students were not engaging with outside sources properly. Key issues discussed include lack of engagement with broad source ideas (in favor of picking out quotes), lack of paraphrasing, and inability to link information between multiple sources.

==== Davis ====
Phillip M. Davis based much of the analysis in his study on data gathered by the Citation Project. This study aimed to examine the particular effects web-based research and study had on undergraduate's papers and the replicability of their bibliographies. Davis sought to see how the shift from physical in-person library based research to online, often at-home research changed the function and usability of the bibliography as a form of documenting source usage in a given work. The primary method of analysis involved examining students' bibliographies to see where they were finding information online and how these sources were accessed. A main issue Davis found was "persistency" of URLs used for online citations. He found that only 18% of URL-based citations continued to function (the others either no longer pointing to the correct document or ceasing to exist altogether) within 3 years of their usage by students, and more than half of claimed online citations could not be found in any form. He suggests that this result brings up questions about how web-based citations should be dealt with in a university context.
